IV of Spades (stylized as IV OF SPADES, pronounced "four of spades") is a Filipino rock band from Metro Manila, Philippines, consisting of vocalist, bassist and keyboardist Zild Benitez, vocalist and lead guitarist Blaster Silonga, and drummer Badjao de Castro. Unique served as the band's lead vocalist and rhythm guitarist until 2018. The band first gained exposure with the release of their 4th single "Mundo". On August 21, 2020, the band entered a hiatus.

Their musical style has been described as "pop funk" and funk rock by the local press. IV of Spades has been nominated for several musical awards, both in the Philippines and internationally. The band is also known for their 1970s-inspired outfits.

History

2014–2020: Early years
In July 2014, Allan Mitchell Silonga also known as "DADDY A" planned and decided to form a band for his son Blaster, who would become the band's lead guitarist and vocals. Daddy A handpicked and recruit drummer Badjao de Castro and bassist Zild Benitez, who are the sons of Daddy A's friends. Unique Salonga, Benitez's churchmate who was already writing his own music, was later recruited to become the band's lead singer.

Most of the band members are sons of musicians. Blaster's father, Allan Silonga, is a member of 90s band Kindred Garden after a while evolved as k24/7 and the singing group Daddy's Home which finished third in The X Factor Philippines. Zild's father, Franklin Benitez, was the drummer of Hungry Young Poets and Barbie's Cradle.
Badjao's father, Chuck de Castro, was a member of Makatha & Posivity Band and was also a session rhythm guitarist of the Rage Band. Blaster and Zild gained popularity when they became contestants for Eat Bulaga!s hit contest, Music Hero. Zild was the first member of the Music Hero Squad and was the Bass Guitar grand champion, Blaster won the Electric Guitar grand champion and the title of Ultimate Music Hero.

IV of Spades signed to a record label and released their first single "Ilaw sa Daan" under Warner Music Philippines.

The group's second single, “Hey Barbara” was released on July 9, 2017 and followed up by their third single “Where Have You Been My Disco?”, released on December 9, 2017 via YouTube.

2018: Mundo, Rise in popularity and Unique's departure
In 2018, the band released their fourth single called "Mundo". A video of their live performance on the song, which was uploaded on Metro Manila-based radio station Wish 107.5's YouTube channel, became the group's highest viewed single on YouTube with 137 million views as of November 2020.

IV of Spades won the New Artist of the Year and the MYX Bandarito Performance of the Year and Nominated as Group the Year at the annual MYX Music Awards. The band also won the Dreams Come True with Air Asia, the airline's search for the most promising acts in the region. The band performed with David Foster as part of their prize. They also won the Favorite New Group award at the 30th annual Awit Awards.

On May 5, 2018, the band announced on their official social media accounts that lead vocalist Unique Salonga had left in order to pursue "personal endeavors".

On July 12, 2018, the song "In My Prison" was released simultaneously on Spotify and YouTube. It is the band's first single after Salonga's departure, with Benitez taking over full-time as lead vocalist. They released their sixth single "Bata, Dahan-Dahan!" on September 14, 2018.

After they released their sixth single, they released another single "Sa Kahapon" and this time, with hip-hop artist and rapper Shanti Dope for Coke Studio Homecoming.

In October 2018, IV of Spades was nominated for the Best Southeast Asia Act category in the 2018 MTV Europe Music Awards but lost to Joe Flizzow of Malaysian hip-hop group Too Phat. Within the same month, they returned to Wish 107.5 and collaborated with Moira dela Torre with a new song entitled "Huli Na Ba Ang Lahat". The song was first unveiled during a digital concert held on October 8, 2018. The show, staged by Acer Philippines in partnership with Wish 107.5, was part of the annually-held Acer Day celebration.

2019: ClapClapClap!
The band released their debut studio album, ClapClapClap!, on January 18, 2019. The album consisted of 15 songs. The most popular being Come Inside of My Heart.

2020–present
The band then released their single entitled "Ang Pinagmulan", on February 16, 2020. After 2 months, they released their latest single entitled "Sariling Multo (Sa Panaginip)", on April 17, 2020. The band then announced their hiatus on August 21, 2020.

Musical style and influences
IV of Spades is heavily inspired by 1970s fashion, acts and sounds. Members of the band have cited various musical groups and artists as songwriting influences, including ABBA, Kings of Leon, Tame Impala, My Chemical Romance, Radiohead and Jet. The band's genre is a mix of 1970s influenced disco, funk, alternative rock and Manila Sound..

Band membersCurrent members Zild Benitez – lead vocals, bass guitar (2014–present); keyboards, synth bass, programming (2018–present)
 Blaster Silonga – lead guitar and backing vocals (2014–present); lead vocals (2018–present) 
 Badjao de Castro – drums, percussion (2014–present); backing vocals (2018–present)Past members Unique Salonga – lead vocals, rhythm guitar (2014–2018)

DiscographyStudio album2019: ClapClapClap!

ToursHeadlining'
 The Sweet Shadow Tour (2019)

Awards & nominations

References

2014 establishments in the Philippines
Filipino pop music groups
Filipino rock music groups
Musical groups established in 2014
Musical groups from Metro Manila
Warner Music Philippines artists